Lieutenant Colonel Besby Frank Holmes (December 5, 1917 – July 23, 2006) was an American fighter pilot who in April 1943 took part in Operation Vengeance, a notable American wartime effort to kill Japanese admiral Isoroku Yamamoto, who had planned the attack on Pearl Harbor. Holmes was awarded a Navy Cross for his role in the mission, and later earned the Distinguished Flying Cross (with two oak leaf clusters) and an Air Medal.

Holmes, a native of San Francisco, graduated from Balboa High School and City College of San Francisco. He enlisted in March 1941, and was present in Pearl Harbor during the attack of December 7, 1941. He remained in the military until 1968, also serving in the Korean War and Vietnam War. He lived in San Rafael, California, following his retirement. He was inducted by the Commemorative Air Force to the Combat Airman Hall of Fame in 2003.

Holmes died of a stroke in 2006 at Marin General Hospital in Greenbrae, California. He was survived by his wife and four children. He is interred at Golden Gate National Cemetery.

References

1917 births
2006 deaths
People from San Francisco
City College of San Francisco alumni
United States Army Air Forces officers
United States Army Air Forces pilots of World War II
United States Air Force officers
United States Air Force personnel of the Korean War
United States Air Force personnel of the Vietnam War
Recipients of the Navy Cross (United States)
Recipients of the Distinguished Flying Cross (United States)
Recipients of the Air Medal
Burials at Golden Gate National Cemetery